The CTI Education Group (CTI) was a registered, private higher education institution in South Africa. Full-time and part-time students can study within the fields of Information Technology, Psychology & Counselling, Creative Arts & Graphic Design, Commerce and Law on campuses spread throughout South Africa.

Private Higher Education Institutions in South Africa 

South Africa has a variety of higher education institutions to choose from, ranging from public universities, colleges, private institutions, institutes of technology and academies. CTI Education Group is a registered Private Higher Education Institution and is not a public establishment and therefore not funded by the Department of Higher Education and Training. Both public and private tertiary establishments may offer the same qualifications but academic experiences might differ. CTI offers short learning programmes, degrees, higher certificates and postgraduate degrees such as honours and masters programmes. It is also important to ensure you are familiar with the National Qualification Framework (NQF) level of your chosen qualification, as it can range from a Higher Certificate to a Doctoral Degree. CTI Education Group also required its degree-conferring status in 2012, which means the institution developed and launched its own degrees in the Business and IT faculties, placing it alongside university-level institutions.

CTI conferred B.Com and B.Sc (IT) Degrees 
CTI's new B.Com, Higher certificates and B.Sc. (IT) degrees will be available through full-time study from 2013 at all of the group's twelve campuses across South Africa. The two South African accredited degrees are also quality assured in the United Kingdom. Both degrees are accredited by the South African Higher Education Quality Committee and registered on the National Qualifications Framework (NQF) by the South African Qualification Authority. At the same time, the degrees are externally moderated by Cardiff Metropolitan University in Wales.

History and Structure 
CTI was incepted in 1979 and formed a partnership with the private university, Midrand Graduate Institute (MGI) in 2006. CTI, formerly known as the Computer Training Institute broadened its horizons with this and various other partnerships to include, not only computer related education, but other fields such as Graphic Design, Commerce, Accounting, Law and Psychology. In 2011, the education organisation, Pearson Education, acquired 75% stake in CTI Education Group. CTI fully became part of Pearson in 2013. CTI is also an official UNISA licensee for tuition support, offering on-campus lectures, support and examination for the UNISA LLB degree.

CTI has grown from one campus situated in Randburg, Gauteng, to having 13 remote campuses located across South Africa (this also includes the MGI campus situated in Midrand)

Senate 
The CTI Education Group's Senate is responsible for regulating and directing the academic work of the Institute and is regarded as its supreme academic authority. It is the responsibility of the Senate to plan, approve, develop, maintain, regulate and promote all teaching, programmes of study, research and other academic work of the institute, and to formulate policies accordingly. The CTI Senate is accountable to the Management Committee and the CTI Board of Directors for the academic and research functions of the institution and also performs such other functions as may be delegated or assigned to it by the Management Committee and Board of Directors. It also represents CTI and its community by providing a platform for deliberations and decisions regarding all matters relating to scholarship and academic governance. This important structure is the peak body for advising the chief executive officer, the Management Committee and the Board of Directors on academic matters and broad issues which affect the academic excellence of the institute. Its role encompasses policies, systems, services, structures and strategies that impact upon teaching and research, students and staff. The Senate is a key forum for academic staff to discuss matters of interest including those relating to the broader governmental, political or market environment. It also serves as a conduit for disseminating key information throughout the institute, including information regarding the external environment affecting the Institute as a whole.

The Advisory Council 
The Advisory Council assists the group in achieving its goals by identifying and addressing both higher education policy issues and academic operations (teaching, learning, assessment and curriculum development), as well as challenges related to quality assurance. The Advisory Council also provides the group with strategic advice on the management of its relationships with stakeholders and other higher education institutions. The Advisory Council is multidisciplinary and comprises high-profile experts in areas of higher education policy and its legislative requirements, as well as academic quality assurance and strategic issues. It provides this strategic leadership and direction through an appropriate mix of skills, experience, credibility and demographic diversity. The Advisory Board Members incorporates members from various IT (hardware and software) backgrounds who are currently working in industry. Their aim is to guide and advise CTI about the latest trends in the IT industry, so that these insights can be incorporated into learning material to ensure graduates are fully geared to meeting industry needs. These Advisory Board members are closely involved with the reviewing of study materials to enable CTI to achieve its goal of meeting industry needs.

Teaching Methodology 

CTI has developed two teaching methodologies. The Mastery Learning Methodology (MLM) enables students to pace their own studies and monthly reports will update the parents on the student's progress. The student is also able to fast track their studies and obtain employment earlier than their university counterparts. Students have different levels of prior learning and different learning abilities and therefore learn new material at different speeds. CTI's studies have shown that the modular approach of the MLM route improves students’ subject retention and skills mastery by as much as 300% over a
lecture-based approach. Students studying the Certificate in Information Systems qualifications and short learning programmes (IT Engineering, Comprehensive Programming and Internet Development Specialist) learn via the MLM route. These students can pace their studies to suit their experience and ability.  Due to the unique nature of the MLM route, students can start in any week of the year. The methodology is modular and courses are completed and examined sequentially. A student qualifies when all the courses have been successfully completed.

The Instructor-Led Training (ILT) involves the traditional lecturing environment and bi-annual exam sessions.

International Educational Relationship 

With the launch of the new Higher Education Quality Committee (HEQC) accredited degrees, CTI established a partnership with the Cardiff Metropolitan University which supports the quality-assurance of the degrees according to international standards and ensures that the quality is of equivalent standing to a UK degree. Graduates will have the opportunity to apply for postgraduate studies at many other UK universities abroad. Students, who have successfully completed the CTI Higher certificates, moderated and quality assured by Cardiff Metropolitan University may be considered for direct entry to Cardiff Metropolitan University's bachelor’s or master's degrees, provided they meet all other necessary entry criteria. Students could also benefit from Cardiff Metropolitan University's outward mobility programme which involves the exchange of students between CTI in South Africa and Cardiff Metropolitan University in the UK.

Locations 

CTI has a number of campuses around South Africa, which include Bedfordview, Bloemfontein, Cape Town, Durban, Durbanville, East London, Nelspruit, Port Elizabeth, Potchefstroom, Pretoria, Randburg, Vanderbijlpark, as well as the MGI campus in Midrand. CTI's Head Office and International Students Office are both located in Fourways.

Services 

CTI's Student Advisory service includes personal sessions with a qualified Student Advisor on campus - acting as the contact point regarding course fees, entrance requirements, payment options, career guidance, registration and qualification accreditation to prospective students and parents/sponsors. CTI also has a dedicated Process Office, with Account Executives offering students' assistance with applying for a student loan at respective banks. CTI also has a dedicated placement programme to assist in securing suitable employment after graduation.

Enhanced Learning 

CTI Education Group became the first Higher education|higher education institution in South Africa to offer its students tablet computers loaded with prescribed textbooks in 2013. The tablets were supplied to students commencing their Higher certificate and BSc in Information Technology degrees at CTI's twelve campuses across South Africa. CTI is part of Pearson Education a pioneer in the use of digital and mobile technologies to enhance learning.

Ranking

References

External links 
CTI Education Group website

Organizations established in 1979
Distance education institutions based in South Africa
Colleges in South Africa